Jaime Martín (born 1 September 1965) is a Spanish conductor and flautist.

Biography
Born in Santander, Spain, Martín began his music studies on the flute at age 8, and became a member of the National Youth Orchestra of Spain at age 13. He was a pupil of Antonio Arias in Madrid and later with Paul Verhey in The Hague. He began his career as a flautist. He attained posts as principal flute with the Academy of St Martin in the Fields, the Royal Philharmonic Orchestra and the London Philharmonic Orchestra, the last post with the LPO for 3 years. He also worked regularly as a member of the Chamber Orchestra of Europe. In 1991, he made his debut as soloist at Carnegie Hall with the Flute Concerto by Nielsen. He has recorded chamber music with the Gaudier Ensemble, the Brindisi String Quartet, Pinchas Zukerman and others. He is a founder member of the Cadaqués Orchestra. In 1998, he became a flute teacher at the Royal College of Music, London.

Martín became chief conductor (director titular) of the Orquesta de Cadaqués in 2011.  In July 2012, Martín became artistic adviser of the Gävle Symphony Orchestra.  On 1 July 2013, he became the orchestra's principal conductor, with an initial contract of 4 years.  In September 2015, the orchestra extended his contract through 2020.  Martín had been scheduled to conclude his tenure as chief conductor of the Gävle Symphony Orchestra at the close of the 2020-2021 season.  However, in the wake of the COVID-19 pandemic, the orchestra and Martín extended the scheduled date of the conclusion of his tenure by one year, into 2022.  He has recorded commercially with the Gävle Symphony Orchestra for such labels as Ondine.

Martín first guest-conducted the National Symphony Orchestra (Ireland) in September 2016. Following three subsequent return guest-conducting appearances, in January 2018, the National Symphony Orchestra announced the appointment of Martín as its next chief conductor, effective with the 2019–2020 season, with an initial contract of three years.  In August 2022, the National Symphony Orchestra announced a two-season extension of Martín's contract as its chief conductor.

In September 2017, Martín first guest-conducted the Los Angeles Chamber Orchestra (LACO). On the basis of this appearance, in February 2018, the LACO named Martín its next music director, effective with the 2019–2020 season, with an initial contract of three years.  In June 2021, the LACO announced an extension of Martín's contract through 2027.

Martín first guest-conducted the Melbourne Symphony Orchestra (MSO) in June 2019, and returned for an additional guest-conducting appearance in February 2021.  In June 2021, the MSO announced the appointment of Martín as its next chief conductor, effective in 2022.

Martín has commissioned premieres of works by Ellen Reid, Andrew Norman, Missy Mazzoli, Derrick Skye, Albert Schnelzer and Juan Pablo Contreras.  He is a Fellow of the Royal College of Music, London.

Martín is married to Rachel Gough, principal bassoonist of the London Symphony Orchestra.  The couple have two sons and make their home in London.

References

External links
 Official home page of Jaime Martín
 IMG Artists agency page on Jaime Martín
 Bridge Arts Management agency page on Jaime Martín
 Juan Cervantes, 'An Interview with Jaime Martin'.  Primephonic website, 7 June 2017
 Swedish-language Gävle Symphony Orchestra page on Jaime Martín
 'Ep. 90: Jaime Martín, conductor'.  Interview by Tigran Arakelyan, 29 April 2020

1965 births
Academics of the Royal Academy of Music
Musicians from Cantabria
Living people
People from Santander, Spain
Spanish classical flautists